Tamarind can refer to Tamarindus indica, and to several other tropical trees, including:

Diploglottis australis, native tamarind, a rainforest tree of Eastern Australia
 Garcinia gummi-gutta, Malabar tamarind, native to Indonesia

See also
Velvet tamarind